Houilles–Carrières-sur-Seine station (French: Gare de Houilles-Carrières-sur-Seine) is a railway station in Houilles, a suburb of Paris, on the Paris–Le Havre railway. Trains arrive at the station from Gare Saint-Lazare and the RER.

See also
 List of stations of the Paris RER

External links

 

Railway stations in Yvelines